The St. Raphael River is a river in the Unorganized Part of Thunder Bay District in Northwestern Ontario, Canada. The river is part of the James Bay drainage basin and is a left tributary of the Miniss River.

The river begins at Aki Lake and flows north to St. Raphael Lake, then northwest to Churchill Lake. It heads northeast from the lake and reaches its mouth at the Miniss River. The Miniss River flows to Lake St. Joseph, then via the Albany River to James Bay.

Tributaries
Quaint Creek (right)
Spirit Creek (left)
Cal Creek (right)

References

Sources

Saint Raphael River